Prestwich by-election, 1918 may refer to:

 January 1918 Prestwich by-election
 October 1918 Prestwich by-election